Thomas J. Deadrick is a former Republican member of the South Dakota House of Representatives, representing the 21st District from 2003 and 2011. He also served as the Speaker of the House. His district included Brule, Buffalo, Charles Mix, Jones and Lyman counties.

External links
South Dakota Legislature - Representative Thomas J. Deadrick official SD House website

Project Vote Smart - Representative Thomas Deadrick (SD) profile
Follow the Money - Thomas J Deadrick
2006 2004 2002 campaign contributions

1952 births
Living people
Speakers of the South Dakota House of Representatives
Republican Party members of the South Dakota House of Representatives
South Dakota lawyers